This is a list of people who served as President of the British Liberal Party. The Liberal Party merged into the Liberal Democrats in 1988.

The post was established in 1877 as President of the National Liberal Federation.  In 1936, this body was replaced by the Liberal Party Organisation, which survived until 1988.

Presidents

President of the National Liberal Federation

President of the Liberal Party Organisation

In 1988, Michael Meadowcroft was President-Elect of the Liberal Party for the 1988–89 year; but the Liberal Party merger with the Social Democratic Party went ahead before he could take up office.

References

Liberal Party (UK)